The Gottfried Brockmann Prize is a juried art prize, awarded every two years since 1985 by the city of Kiel in Schleswig-Holstein, Germany.

About 

The prize, endowed with 5,000 euros, serves to promote young figurative artists, who live and work in the city of Kiel or the surrounding area. The prizewinners must not have reached the age of 35 and should "show a promising development for the future". The award ceremony is accompanied by an exhibition in the Stadtgalerie Kiel (English: City Gallery Kiel).

Previous award winners 
 1985: Rainer Grodnick
 1987: Johannes Michlerv
 1989: Carsten Höller and Thomas Karpv
 1991: Julia Bornefeld
 1993: Ilka Kollath
 1995: Hansjörg Schneider and Claudia Sweekhorst
 1997: Miron Schmückle
 1999: 
 2001: Matthias Meyer
 2003: Johanna Domke
 2005: Nina Heinzel
 2007: 
 2009: Hendrik Lörper
 2011: Samuel Seger
 2013: Benjamin Mastaglio
 2015: Constanze Vogt
 2017: Anne Steinhagen
 2019: Hannah Bohnen

References

External links 
 Gottfried-Brockmann-Preis on the website of the city of Kiel

German awards
Awards established in 1985
Kiel